Lucas Wolf (born September 6, 1994) is a German racing driver. 2012 he starts in the Formula 3 Euro Series.

Career 
Wolf was born in Heidelberg. He began his racing career in karting. He remained in karting until 2009. 2010 he began his formula racing career. For URD Rennsport he competed in the ADAC Formel Masters. Wolf concluded the season on the eighth position with a third place as his best result. 2011 he stayed with URD Rennsport in the ADAC Formel Masters. After managing to podium finishes on the penultimate round, he won the last race of the ultimate round. In the end again lay on the eighth place in the championship.

2012 Wolf switched to the Formula 3 Euro Series, where he stayed with URD Rennsport.

Career summary 
 2010: ADAC Formel Masters (8th position)
 2011: ADAC Formel Masters (8th position)
 2012: Formula 3 Euro Series

References

External links 
 
 

1994 births
Living people
Sportspeople from Heidelberg
German racing drivers
ADAC Formel Masters drivers
Formula 3 Euro Series drivers
British Formula Three Championship drivers
FIA Formula 3 European Championship drivers
Blancpain Endurance Series drivers